West Ecclesfield ward—which includes the districts of Burncross, Grenoside, High Green—is one of the 28 electoral wards in City of Sheffield, England. The population of this ward in 2011 was 17,699 people in 7,675 households. West Ecclesfield was one of the six wards that made up the former Sheffield Hillsborough Parliamentary constituency. In their final report, the Boundary Commission for England recommended that West Ecclesfield form part of a reformed Penistone Parliamentary constituency. West Ecclesfield is composed of a number of polling districts. There are six in total; Angram Bank, Burncross, Grenoside one and two, Mortomley and Wortley Road.

Districts in West Ecclesfield ward

Burncross
Burncross is in the north of the ward west of Chapeltown. It is a mostly residential area, which includes the Grade II listed Barnes Hall, rebuilt in 1824.

Grenoside

Grenoside is isolated from the other two districts in the south of the ward. It is at a closer proximity to Parson Cross.

High Green

High Green is north-west of Burncross. It is the most northerly suburb of Sheffield.

Ecclesfield
Wards of Sheffield